Krzysztof Baran (born 12 February 1990) is a Polish professional footballer who plays as a goalkeeper for Lechia Tomaszów Mazowiecki.

Club career
On 9 October 2020, he joined fourth-tier Danish club Kjellerup IF.

References

External links 
 
 

1990 births
Living people
People from Tomaszów Mazowiecki
Sportspeople from Łódź Voivodeship
Polish footballers
Association football goalkeepers
UKS SMS Łódź players
Chojniczanka Chojnice players
Jagiellonia Białystok players
Ruch Radzionków players
Podbeskidzie Bielsko-Biała players
Bruk-Bet Termalica Nieciecza players
GKS Katowice players
Sandecja Nowy Sącz players
Kjellerup IF players
Ekstraklasa players
I liga players
III liga players
Polish expatriate footballers
Expatriate men's footballers in Denmark